Jacob Temminck (November 1748-August 15, 1822) was a treasurer in the Dutch East India Company and a collector of natural history objects, including a large number of bird specimens acquired through field collectors such as François Levaillant. His collection were passed on to his son, Coenraad Jacob Temminck (1778 – 1858), who was a noted ornithologist.

References

Administrators of the Dutch East India Company